Elephant's Eggs in a Rhubarb Tree is a 1971 British children's show which featured a variety of poems, songs, and comedy sketches.

Premise
The show featured recitations of works from such writers as T.S Eliot, Hilaire Belloc, and Spike Milligan. The cast of the show would often dress up as the characters in the poems and songs that were being recited.

Cast
Ann Beach
Richard Beckinsale
John Gould
David Rowlands
Paul Whitsun-Jones

Production
The series was recorded at Teddington Studios in Studio 2.

Episodes
Three of the six episodes of Elephant's Eggs in a Rhubarb Tree were filmed in black and white due to the Colour Strike in 1971. All six episodes are missing, believed wiped.

References

External links

1970s British children's television series